El Amria District is a district of Aïn Témouchent Province, Algeria.

Municipalities 
The district is divided into 5 municipalities:
El Amria
Bou Zedjar
Ouled Boudjemaa
El Messaid
Hassi El Ghella

References 

Districts of Aïn Témouchent Province